"I'll Cry Instead" is a song written by John Lennon (credited to Lennon–McCartney), and recorded by the English rock band the Beatles for their third studio album, A Hard Day's Night (1964), a part-studio and part-soundtrack album to their film of the same name (1964). The song was released as a single in the US and later appeared on the album Something New in the US.

Background and composition 

Both John Lennon and Paul McCartney identified "I'll Cry Instead" as having been written entirely by Lennon. Lennon wrote the song for inclusion in the Beatles' 1964 film, A Hard Day's Night, intended for use in the film's "break out" and open field sequence. Director Richard Lester disliked the song and replaced it in the film with "Can't Buy Me Love", so the band opted to wait on its recording.

Lyrics 

Lennon later reflected that the lyrics of "I'll Cry Instead" represent his then newfound feelings of frustration with success and the sense that he had lost his freedom. Lennon's wife, Cynthia Lennon, similarly described the lyrics as a cry for help, explaining that "[i]t reflects the frustration he felt at that time", being "the idol of millions... [while] the freedom and fun of the early days had gone." McCartney later suggested the song referred to difficulties in Lennon's marriage with Cynthia.

In contrast to the Beatles' earlier teenage love songs, the lyrics of "I'll Cry Instead" are comparatively darker. The song's singer explains that, while he is now crying over a lost love, he plans to seek vengeance and break the hearts of girls "around the world", thereby punishing anyone who had ever rejected him. Author and musician John Kruth describes the song as one of Lennon's "stalker songs", alongside his other 1964 compositions "You Can't Do That" and "No Reply", dealing in themes of separation and uncontrollable jealousy. The singer makes reference to a chip on his shoulder, something author Steve Turner suggests signals Lennon's entrance into a period of self-examination that lasted through the 1969–1970 break-up of the Beatles and his first solo albums.

Music 

"I'll Cry Instead" is in 4/4 (common time) and is in the key of G major, except the bridge, which modulates to D major. The song uses the three blues chords I, IV and V. Structurally, it employs two bridges while avoiding instrumental solos and double verses between bridges.

Among musicologists and authors, several describe "I'll Cry Instead" as country, including Ian MacDonald, Jean-Michael Guesdon & Philippe Margotin, Alan W. Pollack, Tim Riley and William Ruhlmann. Jonathan Gould calls is "rockabilly-styled", and Stephen Thomas Erlewine describes it as "tough folk rock". Country music was popular in the Beatles' hometown of Liverpool throughout the 1950s and Lennon listened to the genre regularly before he experienced rock and roll. Doggett writes the song is the first among several by the Beatles from 1964 and 1965 that were overtly country and rockabilly influenced, as does critic Richie Unterberger, who compares the song to the Beatles' next studio album, Beatles for Sale, and McCartney's 1965 composition "I've Just Seen a Face". Doggett further comments that, even if it lacks the "pace or bite of Carl Perkins or Elvis Presley at their peak", the influence is heard in the lead guitar work of George Harrison, as well as Lennon's rhythm guitar playing and chord progressions.

Production

Recording 

The Beatles recorded "I'll Cry Instead" on 1 June 1964, during an afternoon session in which they also recorded covers of "Matchbox" and "Slow Down". Recording took place in EMI's Studio Two, with George Martin producing the session, assisted by balance engineer Norman Smith. Rather than recording the song straight through, the Beatles split it into two parts designated "Section A" and "Section B", something author John C. Winn suggests would allow for greater versatility in editing the track into the film.

Six takes of "Section A" were recorded followed by two takes of "Section B", with the latter takes marked seven and eight. Both sections consist of four tracks, with electric guitar, bass and drums on the first track; Lennon's vocal on the second; his acoustic guitar on the third; and overdubs onto the fourth, including a tambourine from Ringo Starr and a second vocal from Lennon to double-track his original. On the third line of each verse ("show you what your lovin' man can do"), McCartney adds a bass break which Riley suggests anticipates those heard on the Beatles' 1966 songs "Rain" and "I'm Only Sleeping".

Mixing 

On 4 June 1964, Martin and Smith mixed several songs, including "I'll Cry Instead". They mixed each section for mono, then edited takes six and eight together; take six consists of the first two verses, the bridge and the third verse, while take eight begins at 1:09, containing the fourth verse, a repeating bridge and a fifth verse. The completed mono mix lasts 2:04. On 9 June, Martin and Smith copied this mix, sending it to the US record labels United Artists and Capitol.

On 22 June 1964, Martin and Smith finished production on the rest of the A Hard Day's Night LP, including mixing "I'll Cry Instead" for stereo. Like the mono version, they edited together takes six and eight, but joined the takes at a different place. After an edit at 1:08, the song cuts to the second bridge, omitting the fourth verse and resulting in a length of 1:43, 21 seconds shorter than the US mono mix. To make the mono and stereo version match, they roughly trimmed the mono version, bringing it down to 1:44, though this fix was only made to the UK mono releases, the longer mono version having already been sent for printing in the US.

Release 

EMI's Parlophone label released the A Hard Day's Night LP in the UK on 10 July 1964. "I'll Cry Instead" appears on the album's second side, sequenced alongside the other tracks that do not appear in the film. Despite the song's absence from the film, United Artists kept the song on the North American version of A Hard Day's Night, released in the US on 26 June 1964. Capitol retained the rights to the same songs, so long as they were not marketed as a film soundtrack, and began issuing songs from the United Artists soundtrack as singles in the US. The label released "I'll Cry Instead" as a single in the US on 20 July 1964, backed with "I'm Happy Just to Dance with You". Capitol collected the released singles on the North American LP Something New, also released on 20 July 1964, sequencing "I'll Cry Instead" as the album's opening track.

When Universal Pictures and Walter Shenson re-released A Hard Day's Night in theaters in 1982, "I'll Cry Instead" was included in an opening sequence as a tribute to Lennon, consisting of a "Swingin'" early to mid-1960s-style collage of photos of the Beatles in 1964.

Personnel
According to Ian MacDonald:

John Lennon double-tracked vocal, acoustic rhythm guitar
Paul McCartney bass
George Harrison lead guitar
Ringo Starr drums, tambourine

Chart performance

Notes

References

Citations

Sources

External links
 Full lyrics for the song at the Beatles' official website

1964 songs
1964 singles
The Beatles songs
Song recordings produced by George Martin
Songs written by Lennon–McCartney
Chet Atkins songs
Billy Joel songs
1964 debut singles
Joe Cocker songs
Capitol Records singles
Songs written for films
Songs published by Northern Songs
British country music songs
British folk rock songs
Rockabilly songs